Alan Thomas Randall (24 April 1925 – 24 May 2000) was an Australian rules footballer who played for the Essendon Football Club in the Victorian Football League (VFL).

Notes

External links 

1925 births
2000 deaths
Australian rules footballers from Victoria (Australia)
Essendon Football Club players